McGregor station is on the Canadian National Railway mainline in McGregor, British Columbia.  Via Rail's Jasper – Prince Rupert train calls at the station as a flag stop.

The station was opened in 1915 by the Grand Trunk Pacific Railway as the Dewey railway station.  In 1930 the name of the community and station was changed to Cornel railway station and again in 1956 it was changed to McGregor.

Footnotes

External links 
Via Rail Station Description

Via Rail stations in British Columbia
Railway stations in Canada opened in 1915
1915 establishments in British Columbia